Lesbian, gay, bisexual and transgender (LGBT) people in Mongolia may face legal and social challenges not experienced by non-LGBT people, though there have been substantial improvements since the 1990s. Homosexuality was criminalised in Mongolia in 1961 through its Criminal Code. Following the Mongolian Revolution of 1990 and the peaceful transition to a democracy, homosexuality was legalised and awareness about LGBT people has become more prevalent. Hate crimes on the basis of sexual orientation and gender identity result in additional legal penalties. Hate speech based on these two categories has been outlawed in the country since 1 July 2017. Households headed by same-sex couples are, however, not eligible for the same legal protections available to opposite-sex couples.

The LGBT Centre (active since 2007) states "advocacy for the human rights of lesbian, gay, bisexual and transgender people in Mongolia" to be its mandate. It is the main engine behind the policy and legislative changes in the country around LGBT rights. Historically, the first gay men's human rights organisation was established in March 1999, and was called Tavilan (meaning "destiny" in Mongolian).

Legality of same-sex sexual acts
Genghis Khan banned homosexual acts in the Mongol Empire and made them punishable by death, hoping to expand the Mongolian population which was about 1.5 million at the time, while the rival Song Dynasty, which dominated today's central China, was 100 million strong.

The Khalkha Mongols, like many early Siberian peoples, placed a high regard on heterosexual fertility, love, and intercourse and therefore viewed homosexual affairs as a sort of abomination.

In the very last years of the 17th century, the Khalkha Mongols came under the control of the Qing Dynasty and therefore inherited its anti-homosexuality law, which punished homosexual acts with a year in prison and 100 strikes with heavy bamboo.

After being criminalized in 1961, all mentions of homosexuality were removed from the Mongolian Criminal Code in 1993, effectively legalising private and consensual same-sex sexual activity. The age of consent is 16, regardless of sexual orientation.

Recognition of same-sex relationships
Article 16 (11) of the Mongolian Constitution defines marriage as being "based on the equality and mutual consent of a man and a woman who have reached the age determined by law. The State protects the interests of the family, motherhood, and the child." Same-sex relationships are not recognized under Mongolian law.

Discrimination protections and hate crime laws
Until recently, violence and discrimination against LGBT people in Mongolia were fairly common and often not reported to the police. In 2001, a lesbian woman was raped, abducted and stabbed by two men. In 2009, an ultra-nationalist neo-Nazi group kidnapped three transgender women and sexually assaulted them. None of these crimes was reported to the police for fear of victimization. In February 2014, a gay man was sexually assaulted by a neo-Nazi group. Following public outcry from the LGBT community and civil society organizations, the Government of Mongolia announced in May 2014 that it would consider anti-discrimination legislation to protect LGBT people.

On 3 December 2015, the Mongolian Parliament adopted a new Criminal Code covering hate crimes, with the protected grounds including sexual orientation, gender identity and health status, making Mongolia one of the first Asian countries to have this level of protections for LGBT people. The Criminal Code's coming into force was planned for 1 September 2016; however, the newly elected Cabinet postponed the date to 1 July 2017. As of August 2018, the LGBT Centre was training more than 300 police officers, prosecutors and judges on what hate crimes are and how to properly handle them. Despite this, local reports and LGBT activists say that the police continue to disregard and do not take complaints of hate crimes against LGBT people seriously, and that these attacks often result in no punishment.

Gender identity and expression

An amendment made in June 2009 to Article 20(1) of the Civil Registration Law allows transgender people to change their legal gender on birth certificates or citizen identification cards following sex reassignment surgery.

In addition, hate speech on the basis of gender identity is outlawed in the country. Crimes committed on the basis of the victim's gender identity, known as hate crimes, will result in additional legal penalties.

Sex education
Mongolia's sex education curriculum introduced in 1998 includes discussion on LGBT and sexual health issues, though teachers may choose whether to cover these topics. Several LGBT students have reported discrimination and bullying at schools.

Living conditions
In 2009, after more than 10 failed attempts, the Mongolian Government registered the LGBT Centre, the sole non-governmental LGBT human rights organisation. Initially, the State Registration Agency refused to register the organization because it "conflicts with Mongolian customs and traditions and has the potential to set a wrong example for youth and adolescents." A 2013 report by the LGBT Centre revealed that over 73% of LGBT Mongolians had considered suicide due to social unacceptance and intolerance.

The International Day Against Homophobia, Transphobia and Biphobia has been celebrated in Mongolia since 2011, with events organised by the LGBT Centre. In 2013, the first Pride week was organised by members of the LGBT community. Since 2014, the LGBT Centre has been organising "Equality and Pride Days" annually to promote non-discrimination and equality. The 2018 pride march attracted more than 200 people.

There are several gay bars in Ulaanbaatar, one being called D.D./H.Z.. Multiple LGBT groups have emerged over the years. The first gay group, Tavilan, was founded in 1999 and successfully registered as an NGO, then had its license revoked in 2000 and continued to operate informally. The first lesbian rights organisation, MILC, was established in December 2003 following the failure on the part of the founders of Tavilan to redraft its bylaws to include other sub-communities within the LGBT community. The organisation Zaluus Eruul Mend was established in 2003 to continue the HIV work of Tavilan.

There are no religious barriers to homosexuality, as the dominant religion, Tibetan Buddhism, is silent on homosexuality. Indeed, homophobia is regarded as a form of nationalism, as many Mongolians believe homosexuality to be a product of the West. In December 2018, the LGBT Centre held a social experiment in Ulaanbaatar, placing three LGBT persons (one gay man, one lesbian and one transgender man) on the side of the road and watching bystanders' reactions. Online reactions were mixed, ranging from death threats to negative comments to positive ones, and showed that the public were more welcoming of the lesbian and the transman than of the gay man.

Solongo Batsukh is an openly transgender model, make-up artist and beauty queen. In 2018, she participated in Miss Universe Mongolia.

United Nations
Mongolia has supported landmark LGBT reforms at the United Nations. In 2011, it signed the "joint statement on ending acts of violence and related human rights violations based on sexual orientation and gender identity" at the United Nations, condemning violence and discrimination against LGBT people. In 2016, it supported the appointment of an independent expert to identify what causes violence and discrimination against LGBT people and to find ways to protect them.

Summary table

See also

Human rights in Mongolia
LGBT rights in Asia

References

External links
 
 

LGBT in Mongolia
Mongolia
Law of Mongolia
Politics of Mongolia